Evangelos Nessos (born 27 June 1978) is a Greek  former footballer and most recently manager of TuS Koblenz. He also holds German citizenship.

Coaching career

Early career
Nessos became interim head coach on 11 September 2012 after Michael Dämgen was sacked by TuS Koblenz. Peter Neustädter eventually became the new permanent head coach on 17 September 2012. Neustädter was sacked on 21 August 2013 and Nessos was given a contract to the end of the season. He was sacked on 8 December 2014.

Coaching record

References

External links
 

1978 births
Living people
Greek footballers
1. FC Köln players
1. FC Köln II players
TuS Koblenz players
Bundesliga players
2. Bundesliga players
TuS Koblenz managers
Association football midfielders
Greek football managers
People from Solingen
Sportspeople from Düsseldorf (region)